Nadimpalle is a village in Guntur district of the Indian state of Andhra Pradesh. It is the located in Cherukupalle mandal of Tenali revenue division.

Etymology 
According Nadimpalli village kaifiyat (available in Village Kaifiyats of Guntur Vol-5) the name seems to have come from location of village lying in between Gudavalli and Ponnapalli. Naduma in Telugu means middle/ in between. Since the village lies in between the above villages it got the name Nadimpalli

History 

As per village kaifiyat, this village existed as far back as 1141 AD. The same fact was supported by village kaifiyats of Gudavalli, panchalavaram as well.

As per village kaifiyat during 12th century the village was given as Mirasi (karanikam/inam) to certain Brahmins by Goparaju Ramanna  the then prime minister to King Ganapati of Gajapathi dynasty

The kaifiyat also states there were some dilapidated shiva temple in the village and the pond east of it was called Kanchara Gutta as it was excavated by certain person named Kanchara

Mahasivaratri used to be celebrated in Saileswaraswamy temple for one day on Magha Bahula Chaturdasi (Jan-Feb)

Geography 
Nadimpalle is situated to the northwest of the mandal headquarters, Arumbaka,

Demographics 
The village is home to 2,653 people with 808 households. The population consists of 12% schedule castes and 0% schedule tribes. It has healthy sex ratio of 1058 females per 1000 male in the village. The population of this village increased by 2.6% between 2001-11.

Government and politics 
Nadimpalle gram panchayat is the local self-government of the village. It is divided into wards and each ward is represented by a ward member.

Education 

As per the school information report for the academic year 2018–19, the village has a total of 3 Mandal Parishad schools.

See also 
List of villages in Guntur district

References 

Villages in Guntur district